Shabab Al-Dhahiriya Sports Club (Arabic: نادي شباب الظاهرية الرياضي) is a Palestinian professional football team based in Ad-Dhahiriya, Hebron, Palestine and plays in the West Bank Premier League.
Shabab Al-Dhahiriya, or just how fans like to call it: Ghozlan Al-Janoob (غزلان الجنوب) (Arabic for Deers of the South), is one of the most supported football teams in Palestine, and has the largest fan base among all sports teams of the West Bank Premier League. It has won many local competitions, including 2 league titles, 2 local cups, 1 Supercup as well as other various accumulations. The team participated in the 2012–13 UAFA Club Cup, defeating Al-Oruba SC of Oman on a walkover after the Omani team refused to play the second leg game in Palestine due to security matters. The team then reached the second round and lost against Al-Quwa Al-Jawiya of Iraq 4–0 on aggregate. In 2014, Shabab Al-Dhahiriya competed in the 2014 AFC Cup qualifying play-offs against Alay Osh of Kyrgyzstan, and lost 7–8 in penalties after a 1–1 draw. Shabab Al-Dhahiriya is considered to be one of the only teams in Palestine to fully rely on its homegrown talents from its football school. The team has an Ultras fan base called Ultras Ghozlani 74, who are  renowned for their ultra-fanatical support for the team, occasionally to the point of violence and hateful chants and slogans.

Achievements
West Bank Cup:
Winner (2): 1982–83, 2011–12

West Bank First League:
Winner (1): 1985–86

West Bank Youth Cup:
Winner (1): 1993

Palestinian Football Association Cup:
Winner (1): 2005

 West Bank Super Cup:
Winner (1): 2011–12

 Yasser Arafat Cup:
Winner (2): 2011–12, 2015-2016

 West Bank Premier League:
Winner (2): 2011–12, 2014–15

Performance in International competitions
UAFA Cup: 1 appearance
2012–13: Second round

AFC Cup: 2 appearances
2014: Qualifying play-off
2016: Group stage

Current squad

References

External links
League at FIFA.com

Football clubs in the West Bank
Association football clubs established in 1974
1974 establishments in the Israeli Military Governorate